Ravuconazole (codenamed BMS-207147 and ER-30346) is a potent triazole antifungal, the development of which was discontinued in 2007. The drug has shown to have a similar spectrum of activity to voriconazole, with an increased half-life.  However, ravuconazole has limited activity against species of Fusarium, Scedosporium, and Zygomycetes.

See also
 Albaconazole
 Fosravuconazole, a prodrug of ravuconazole
 Isavuconazole

References

27-Hydroxylase inhibitors
Lanosterol 14α-demethylase inhibitors
Nitriles
Fluoroarenes
Phenylethanolamines
Tertiary alcohols
Thiazoles
Triazole antifungals
Abandoned drugs